James A. Herne (born James Ahearn; February 1, 1839 – June 2, 1901) was an American playwright and actor. He is considered by some critics to be the "American Ibsen", and his controversial play Margaret Fleming is often credited with having begun modern drama in America. Herne was a Georgist and wrote Shore Acres to promote the political economy of Henry George.

Biography

Stage actor
James A. Herne was born February 1, 1839, in Cohoes, New York. His parents were poor Irish immigrants who removed him from school at age thirteen to work in a brush factory. Herne decided to become an actor the next year but was twenty before he could join a traveling troupe. He made his debut in 1859 as George in a production of Uncle Tom's Cabin in Troy, New York. He enjoyed modest success as a young actor, appearing in Baltimore and Washington, D.C. with the John Thompson Ford company in the early 1860s. He was the leading man for the Lucille Western Touring Company from 1865 to 1867. He was briefly married, in the early 1860s, to Lucille's sister Helen Western, an actress who later became romantically involved with John Wilkes Booth. Herne managed the Grand Opera House at 23rd and 8th Avenue in New York City for a season.

He then moved to San Francisco in 1870 to manage several other theaters.  In San Francisco, he met David Belasco, with whom he collaborated on at least three of his plays. He also met and married his second wife, actress Katherine Corcoran. The couple had five children, one son, John, and four daughters, Alma, Dorothy, Julie and Katherine Chrystal who usually went by the name Chrystal Herne. Dorothy and Julie were also actresses.

Mary Elitch Long recounted seeing Ahearn in 1889: "A pleasant episode of a visit to New York during the winter...was meeting James A. Herne. Frank Mayo, who had never seen his old friend in his masterpiece, Shore Acres, sat beside me, and during the beautiful scene where the actor, candle in hand, passes up the kitchen stairs and stops to look back, Frank gently took my hand and sighed. I saw the tears that brimmed his eyes. We were the last to leave the theatre; some blocks away he spoke for the first time: 'That was the greatest piece of acting I ever saw.' "This genuine tribute came from a man who himself was the country's idol."

Playwright
Herne was the first American playwright to incorporate dramatic realism. He ventured away from nineteenth century dramatic romance and melodrama.  Much of Herne's work faded into obscurity in the twentieth century. However, he exerted a profound influence, directing American dramatic literature toward the depiction of complex socially realities. This was illustrated in his controversial play Margaret Fleming (1890). The work singled him out as an influential figure in 19th-century drama.

Herne's first successful play, Hearts of Oak, was written and produced with Belasco in 1879.  After this, Herne focused mostly on writing. Of his later plays, only a handful saw financial success in his lifetime. He continued to act, often in his own works, but also in the plays of others. In 1897 Herne played Nathaniel Berry in Shore Acres at the Harlem Opera House. It was the sixth consecutive season that he portrayed this character.

Death 
James A. Herne died at his home, 79 Convent Avenue, in Manhattan, New York City, on June 2, 1901, at 5:00 pm of pneumonia. He initially fell ill two months earlier in Chicago, where he was appearing in his production Sag Harbor.

Works
 Within an Inch of his Life with David Belasco 1879
 Marriage by Moonlight with David Belasco 1879
 Hearts of Oak with David Belasco 1879 from "The Mariner's Compass" by Henry Leslie
 The Minute Men 1886
 Drifting Apart 1888
 Margaret Fleming 1890
 Shore Acres 1893
 Art for Truth's Sake (essay) 1897
 The Reverend Griffith Davenport 1899
 Sag Harbor 1900

Footnotes

Further reading
 Arthur Hobson Quinn, The Early Plays of James A. Herne. Princeton, NJ: Princeton University Press, 1940.
 "James Ahearn Herne," Literature Resource Center. 
 "Theaters," New York Times, October 10, 1897, pg. 5.

External links

 James Herne biography with photo
 

1839 births
1901 deaths
People from Cohoes, New York
American people of Irish descent
Writers from New York (state)
19th-century American male actors
American male stage actors
Vaudeville performers
Male actors from New York (state)
19th-century American dramatists and playwrights
Georgists